The 2021 Tim Hortons Brier, Canada's national men's curling championship, was held from March 5 to 14 at the Markin MacPhail Centre at Canada Olympic Park in Calgary, Alberta.

In the final, Team Alberta, skipped by Brendan Bottcher defeated Team Wild Card 2, skipped by Kevin Koe in an all-Alberta final, and a re-match of the 2019 Brier final. It was Bottcher's first Brier championship after losing the previous three finals. The first six ends of the final were evenly matched with Koe leading 1–0 heading into the seventh end. In the seventh, Koe's first rock picked, and he missed a double on his second shot, allowing Bottcher a draw for three, to go up 3–1. The two teams exchanged singles in the 8th and 9th ends, and in the 10th end, with just 30 seconds left on their time clock, Koe conceded with one rock left, as his team had no possibilities to score two points to tie the game.  As champions, Bottcher and his team went on to represent Canada at the 2021 World Men's Curling Championship, where they finished in sixth place.

The event was originally scheduled to be held in Kelowna, British Columbia. Due to the COVID-19 pandemic in Canada, it was announced that most Curling Canada championships still being held in the 2020–21 curling season (including the World Men's Curling Championship, which will be held at the same site) would be moved to a centralized "bubble" (similar to that of the NHL as in Edmonton) at Canada Olympic Park. All events will be held behind closed doors with no spectators admitted. In addition, due to COVID-19 restrictions and logistics, many provincial playdowns have been cancelled, with teams being selected by their respective member association instead.

When Ontario played Newfoundland and Labrador in Draw 11, it marked the first time that two openly LGBTQ skips (John Epping and Greg Smith respectively) played against each other at the Brier.

Teams
Source:
{| border=1 cellpadding=5 cellspacing=0
!bgcolor="#FF0000" width="250"| 
!bgcolor="#0000CD" width="250"| 
!bgcolor="#0099FF" width="250"| British Columbia
|-
|St. John's CC, St. John's
Skip: Brad Gushue
Third: Mark Nichols
Second: Brett Gallant
Lead: Geoff Walker
Alternate: Ryan McNeil Lamswood
|Saville SC, Edmonton
Skip: Brendan Bottcher
Third: Darren Moulding
Second: Brad Thiessen
Lead: Karrick Martin
Alternate: Pat Janssen
|Vernon CC, Vernon
Skip: Jim Cotter
Third: Steve Laycock
Second: Andrew Nerpin
Lead: Rick Sawatsky
Alternate: Tyler Tardi
|- border=1 cellpadding=5 cellspacing=0
!bgcolor="#FFFF99" width="250"| Manitoba
!bgcolor="#FFFF33" width="250"| New Brunswick
!bgcolor="#DC143C" width="250"| 
|-
|Morris CC, Morris
Skip: Jason Gunnlaugson
Third: Adam Casey
Second: Matt Wozniak
Lead: Connor Njegovan
Alternate: Jacques Gauthier
|Gage Golf & CC, Oromocto
Skip: James Grattan
Third: Jonathan Beuk
Second: Andy McCann
Lead: Jamie Brannen
Alternate: Kevin Keefe|St. John's CC, St. John'sSkip: Greg Smith
Third: Greg Blyde
Second: Alex McDonah
Lead: Evan McDonah
Alternate: Adam Boland|- border=1 cellpadding=5 cellspacing=0
!bgcolor="#228B22" width="250"| Northern Ontario
!bgcolor="#000080" width="250"| 
!bgcolor="#B22222" width="250"| 
|-
|Community First CC, Sault Ste. MarieSkip: Brad Jacobs
Third: Marc Kennedy
Second: E.J. Harnden
Lead: Ryan Harnden
Alternate: Lee Toner|Halifax CC, HalifaxSkip: Scott McDonald
Third: Paul Flemming
Second: Scott Saccary
Lead: Phil Crowell
Alternate: Kevin Ouellette|Leaside CC, TorontoSkip: John Epping
Third: Ryan Fry
Second: Mat Camm
Lead: Brent Laing
|- border=1 cellpadding=5 cellspacing=0
!bgcolor="#006400" width="250"| 
!bgcolor="#00FFFF" width="250"| Quebec
!bgcolor="#32CD32" width="250"| Saskatchewan
|-
|Crapaud Community CC, Crapaud &  Montague CC, MontagueSkip: Eddie MacKenzie
Third: Tyler Smith
Second: Sean Ledgerwood
Lead: Ryan Lowery
Alternate: Aaron Bartling|Glenmore CC, Dollard-des-Ormeaux,  CC Etchemin, Saint-Romuald &  CC Valleyfield, Salaberry-de-ValleyfieldSkip: Mike Fournier
Third: Martin Crête
Second: Félix Asselin
Lead: Jean-François Trépanier
Alternate: William Dion|Wadena Re/Max CC, WadenaSkip: Matt Dunstone
Third: Braeden Moskowy
Second: Kirk Muyres
Lead: Dustin Kidby
|- border=1 cellpadding=5 cellspacing=0
!bgcolor="#A9A9A9" width="250"| Northwest Territories
!bgcolor="#FFDD500" width="250"| Nunavut
!bgcolor="#800080" width="250"| 
|-
|Yellowknife CC, YellowknifeSkip: Greg Skauge
Third: Tom Naugler
Second: Brad Patzer
Lead: Robert Borden
Alternate: David Aho|Iqaluit CC, IqaluitSkip: Peter Mackey
Third: Jeff Nadeau
Second: Greg Howard
Lead: Jeff Chown
Alternate: Brady St. Louis|Whitehorse CC, WhitehorseSkip: Dustin Mikkelsen
Third: Alexx Peech
Second: Brandon Hagen
Lead: Robert Mckinnon
Alternate: Ray Mikkelsen|- border=1 cellpadding=5 cellspacing=0
!bgcolor="#595959" width="250"|  
!bgcolor="#FCCF51" width="250"| Wild Card #2
!bgcolor="#00A6A6" width="250"| Wild Card #3
|-
|West St. Paul CC, West St. PaulSkip: Mike McEwen
Third: Reid Carruthers
Second: Derek Samagalski
Lead: Colin Hodgson
|The Glencoe Club, CalgarySkip: Kevin Koe
Third: B.J. Neufeld
Second: John Morris
Lead: Ben Hebert
Alternate: Mike Caione|Penetanguishene CC, PenetanguisheneSkip: Glenn Howard 
Third: Scott Howard
Second: David Mathers
Lead: Tim March
Alternate: Wayne Middaugh|}

CTRS ranking

As of the 2019–20 season, where at least three out of four players remained on the same team for the 2020–21 season.

Wild card selection
In previous years, a wild card game was played between the top two teams on the Canadian Team Ranking System standings who did not win their provincial championship; the winner of this game was usually granted the final spot in the tournament. However, with many provinces cancelling their provincial championships due to the ongoing COVID-19 pandemic in Canada, thus not allowing many teams to compete for a chance to play at the Brier, Curling Canada opted to include three wild card teams instead of the usual one. These teams directly qualified and did not participate in a play-in game.

For selection, teams must have 3 of 4 returning players from the previous season.

Round-robin standingsFinal round-robin standingsRound-robin results

All draw times are listed in Mountain Standard Time (UTC−07:00).

Draw 1Friday, March 5, 6:30 pmDraw 2Saturday, March 6, 8:30 amDraw 3Saturday, March 6, 1:30 pmDraw 4Saturday, March 6, 6:30 pmDraw 5Sunday, March 7, 8:30 amDraw 6Sunday, March 7, 1:30 pmDraw 7Sunday, March 7, 6:30 pmDraw 8Monday, March 8, 1:30 pmDraw 9Monday, March 8, 6:30 pmDraw 10Tuesday, March 9, 8:30 amDraw 11Tuesday, March 9, 1:30 pmDraw 12Tuesday, March 9, 6:30 pmDraw 13Wednesday, March 10, 8:30 amDraw 14Wednesday, March 10, 1:30 pmDraw 15Wednesday, March 10, 6:30 pmDraw 16Thursday, March 11, 8:30 amDraw 17Thursday, March 11, 1:30 pmDraw 18Thursday, March 11, 6:30 pmChampionship pool standings
The top four teams from each pool advance to the championship pool. All wins and losses earned in the round robin were carried forward into the championship pool.Final Championship Pool StandingsChampionship pool results

Draw 19Friday, March 12, 12:30 pmDraw 20Friday, March 12, 6:30 pmDraw 21Saturday, March 13, 12:30 pmDraw 22Saturday, March 13, 6:30 pmPlayoffs

To offset for the extra pool stage games played due to the additional Wild Card teams admitted to the tournament, the playoffs reverted to the former system consisting of only a semi-final and final, with only top three teams qualifying. The "page playoff" 1-2 game and the "quarter-final" 3-4 game were not played.

SemifinalSunday, March 14, 12:30 pmFinalSunday, March 14, 6:30 pmStatistics
Top 5 player percentagesAfter Championship Pool; minimum 6 gamesPerfect gamesRound robin and championship pool only; minimum 10 shots thrownAwards
The awards and all-star teams were as follows:
All-Star TeamsFirst TeamSkip:  Brad Gushue, Team Canada
Third:  Braeden Moskowy, Saskatchewan
Second:  Brad Thiessen, Alberta
Lead:  Ben Hebert, Team Wild Card 2Second Team''
Skip:  Kevin Koe, Team Wild Card 2
Third:  B.J. Neufeld, Team Wild Card 2
Second:  Brett Gallant, Team Canada
Lead:  Ryan Harnden, Northern Ontario

Ross Harstone Sportsmanship Award
 Brendan Bottcher, Alberta Skip

Hec Gervais Most Valuable Player Award
 Brendan Bottcher, Alberta Skip

Final standings

Provincial and territorial playdowns
Due to the COVID-19 pandemic, many provincial playdowns were cancelled, with member associations electing to send their 2020 champions to the Brier.

 Boston Pizza Cup (Alberta): Cancelled
 BC Men's Curling Championship: Cancelled
 Viterra Championship (Manitoba): Cancelled
 New Brunswick Tankard: Cancelled
 The 2021 Newfoundland and Labrador Tankard was held January 27–31 in St. John's. In the final, Team Greg Smith defeated Team Colin Thomas 9–8 in a double extra end. The event was held in a round robin between eight teams.
 Northern Ontario Men's Provincial Curling Championship: Cancelled
 The 2021 Northwest Territories Men's Curling Championship was held January 30–31 in Yellowknife. Team Greg Skauge defeated Team Glen Hudy two games to one in the best of three series. They were the only teams to enter.
 Deloitte Tankard (Nova Scotia): Cancelled
 The Nunavut Brier Playdowns were played at the Iqaluit Curling Club in Iqaluit, January 8–10. Team MacKey (Peter Mackey, Jeff Nadeau, Greg Howard, Jeff Chown) defeated Team Kingdon (Wade Kingdon, Hunter Tootoo, Peter Van Strien, Cory Bell) 3 games to 2 in a best of five series. Team MacKey won three straight games after losing their first two.
 Ontario Tankard: Cancelled
 The 2021 PEI Tankard was held January 29–30 in O'Leary. Team Eddie MacKenzie defeated Team Blair Jay 3 games to 0 in the best of five series. They were the only two teams to enter the event.
 Quebec Tankard: Cancelled
 SaskTel Tankard (Saskatchewan): Cancelled
 The Yukon Men's Curling Championship was not held, as only one team (Dustin Mikkelsen) entered. The defending Thomas Scoffin rink had been deemed ineligible, as it could not field a full team for the championship due to COVID-19 travel restrictions.

Notes

References

External links

2021 Tim Hortons Brier
Tim Hortons Brier
Curling in Alberta
Tim Hortons Brier
Tim Hortons Brier
Sport in Calgary